The 2000 European Figure Skating Championships was a senior international figure skating competition in the 1999–2000 season. Medals were awarded in the disciplines of men's singles, ladies' singles, pair skating, and ice dancing. The event was held at the Stadthalle in Vienna, Austria from February 6 to 13, 2000.

Qualifying
The competition was open to skaters from European ISU member nations who had reached the age of 15 before 1 July 1999. The corresponding competition for non-European skaters was the 2000 Four Continents Championships. National associations selected their entries based on their own criteria. Based on the results of the 1999 European Championships, each country was allowed between one and three entries per discipline.

Medals table

Competition notes
Due to the large number of participants, the men's and ladies' qualifying groups were split into groups A and B.

Pairs champions Elena Berezhnaya / Anton Sikharulidze were stripped of their title after Berezhnaya tested positive for pseudoephedrine.

Results

Men

Ladies

Pairs
*: Stripped of title due to positive doping test.

Ice dancing

References

External links
 2000 European Figure Skating Championships

European Figure Skating Championships
European Figure Skating Championships, 2000
Figure Skating
International figure skating competitions hosted by Austria
Sports competitions in Vienna
February 2000 sports events in Europe
2000s in Vienna